Horagala West Grama Niladhari Division is a Grama Niladhari Division of the Kotapola Divisional Secretariat of Matara District of Southern Province, Sri Lanka. It has Grama Niladhari Division Code 256D.

Horagala West is a surrounded by the Ilukpitiya, Horagala East, Paragala, Uvaragala, Waralla, Koodaludeniya, Kotapola South and Lindagawahena Grama Niladhari Divisions.

Demographics

Ethnicity 
The Horagala West Grama Niladhari Division has a Sinhalese majority (86.3%). In comparison, the Kotapola Divisional Secretariat (which contains the Horagala West Grama Niladhari Division) has a Sinhalese majority (80.9%) and a significant Indian Tamil population (12.6%)

Religion 
The Horagala West Grama Niladhari Division has a Buddhist majority (86.0%) and a significant Hindu population (10.3%). In comparison, the Kotapola Divisional Secretariat (which contains the Horagala West Grama Niladhari Division) has a Buddhist majority (80.9%) and a significant Hindu population (14.9%)

References 

Grama Niladhari Divisions of Kotapola Divisional Secretariat